The 1998 St. Cloud explosion was a gas explosion that occurred in St. Cloud, Minnesota on December 11, 1998. A work crew installing a utility pole support anchor punctured an underground natural gas pipeline, causing the explosion. The blast killed four people, injured eleven, destroyed six buildings, and caused an estimated $399,000 in damages.

An NTSB report on the incident faulted the safety and emergency practices of Cable Constructors, Inc., whose employees punctured the gas line, and the procedures and training of the St. Cloud fire department for responding to gas leaks.

Timeline of events
Approximately 10:15 a.m. - the CCI work crew punctures the underground gas pipeline
Approximately 10:51 a.m. - the CCI foreman contacts his supervisor to report the leak
11:05 a.m. - the facilities director of the Stearns County Administrative Building places a call to the county chief deputy sheriff after investigating the gas smell and being told by CCI that the leak had occurred
11:06 a.m. - St. Cloud fire department Engine Company 326 is dispatched to the scene, St. Cloud police units 9201 and 9202 are assigned to crowd control at the site
11:16 a.m. - two NSP trucks arrive
11:29 a.m. - an unknown source ignites the gas, causing the explosion

External links

Natural Gas Pipeline Rupture and Subsequent Explosion, St. Cloud, Minnesota, December 11, 1998 - NTSB report on the incident
Natural Gas Pipeline Rupture and Subsequent Explosion, St. Cloud, Minnesota, December 11, 1998 - NTSB executive summary on the incident
http://www.sctimes.com/article/20100829/NLETTER02/108290006/Gas-line-blast-kills-4 

Explosions in 1998
Gas explosions in the United States
Disasters in Minnesota
Explosion
St Cloud Explosion, 1998
St Cloud Explosion, 1998
1998 disasters in the United States